The 2007 Nicky Rackard Cup final was a hurling match played at Croke Park on 3 August 2008 to determine the winners of the 2007 Nicky Rackard Cup, the 3rd season of the Nicky Rackard Cup, a tournament organised by the Gaelic Athletic Association for the third tier hurling teams. The final was contested by Sligo of Connacht and Louth of Leinster, with Sligo winning by 3-19 to 3-10.

References

Nicky Rackard Cup Final
Nicky Rackard Cup Finals
Louth county hurling team matches
Sligo county hurling team matches